Municipal elections were held in Capital City of Podgorica and eleven other municipalities of Montenegro on 25 May 2014.

Electoral system

Voters in Podgorica determine the composition of the City Assembly, which in turn elects the Mayor. This means that the Mayor is only indirectly elected by the voters. Only parties which reach an electoral threshold of 3% may enter the Assembly. 

The Mayor may or may not be a councilor of the Assembly. Assembly's composition is subject to a 4-year election cycle.

Campaign

Socialist People's Party (SNP) decided to run independently under the slogan "youth, wisdom and courage", with Aleksa Bečić as ballot carrier.

New Serb Democracy (NSD) and Movement for Changes (PzP) decided to run together within Democratic Front alliance, with coalition leader Miodrag Lekić, as ballot carrier.

For this local elections ruling Coalition for European Montenegro is composed by Democratic Party of Socialists (DPS) and Liberal Party (LP) as minor coalition member, with Slavoljub Stijepović as ballot carrier.

Social Democratic Party (SDP) decided to form a pre-election alliance with Positive Montenegro (PCG) under the name the "European Look of Podgorica", with Dragan Bogojević as ballot carrier.

Results

Elected mayor: Slavoljub Stijepović (DPS)

References

2014 elections in Europe
2014 in Montenegro
May 2014 events in Europe